Switzerland competed at the 2011 World Aquatics Championships in Shanghai, China between July 16 and 31, 2011.

Medalists

Diving

Switzerland has qualified 1 athlete in diving.

Men

Open water swimming

Women

Swimming

Switzerland qualified 5 swimmers.

Men

Women

Synchronised swimming

Switzerland has qualified 9 athletes in synchronised swimming.

Women

Reserve
Matilda Wunderlin

References

Nations at the 2011 World Aquatics Championships
2011 in Swiss sport
Switzerland at the World Aquatics Championships